Greenfields School is an independent day and boarding school in Forest Row, East Sussex, England. It services children from 2 to 18. It has a Montessori-based Pre-school & Reception class, followed by Infant, Junior, Senior, 6th Form and EFL (English as a Foreign Language) classes. The school uses the Cambridge Curriculum from Year 1 on up through the rest of the school. The school is a member of the Independent Schools Association.

Greenfields utilises a study method called Study Technology which is a teaching method developed by Church of Scientology founder L. Ron Hubbard, and licensed from U.S. non-profit educational organization Applied Scholastics. The school's website states that it does not teach any religious philosophies and includes children of all nationalities, cultures and religions.

The school has English as a Foreign Language programmes for international students. Summer holiday programmes run from June to August, minimum stay 1 week. The school also runs English programmes all year around for children from 10 to 18 years old. Boarding is on-campus and the school also has many day students.

The school is inspected by the Independent Schools Inspectorate; an inspection was last conducted in 2020.

Recent building developments have included a new four-classroom block in the Senior School, a purpose-built Sports Hall in the Lower School and a complete renovation of the Main Senior Building.

Greenfields School is run by the Greenfields Educational Trust, a registered charity.

In 1994, one of the teachers from the school was jailed for five years after he admitted sexually molesting teenage pupils.

A 2012 newspaper report suggested that many students left the school after completing their GCSEs, without going on to the sixth form, in order to transfer to Sea Org.

References

External links 
 

Private schools in East Sussex
Wealden District